Sanana is a town and administrative center of Sula Islands Regency, North Maluku, Indonesia. This town is located on Sulabesi Island (formerly called Sanana Island).

Villages
Sanana consists of 11 villages (Kelurahan or Desa) namely:
 Fagudu
 Falahu
 Fatcei
 Fogi
 Mangon
 Pastina
 Umaloya
 Wai Ipa
 Waibau
 Waihama
 Wailau

References

External links 

Districts of North Maluku
Populated places in North Maluku
Regency seats of North Maluku